The Casinò di Campione is one of Italy's oldest Casinos, as well as Europe’s largest casino and the largest employer in the municipality of Campione d'Italia, an Italian exclave within Switzerland's Canton of Ticino, on the shores of Lake Lugano.

The casino was founded in 1917 as a site to gather information from foreign diplomats during the First World War. It was owned by the Italian government, and operated by the municipality. The income from the casino was sufficient for the operation of Campione without the imposition of taxes, or obtaining of other revenue. 

The casino was declared bankrupt on 27 July 2018 and  it was closed; on 26 January 2022 it was reopened after three years of inactivity.

Overview 
In 2007, the casino moved into new premises, designed by Swiss architect Mario Botta. The new building was built alongside the old one, which dated from 1933 and has since been demolished.

The casino was illuminated by night, and the building is clearly visible across the lake from the city waterfront of Lugano. It offered roulette, chemin de fer, baccarat, blackjack, poker, and slot machines.

The casino became prominent in the news in 2006 when the son of the last king of Italy, Vittorio Emanuele di Savoia, was accused of procuring girls for prostitution to be sent to clients of the casino.

History 
The first Municipal Casino of Campione was founded in 1917, in the middle of World War I, it remained open for two years and then closed on 19 July 1919. It reopened definitively a few years later, on 2 March 1933. In 2013, it celebrated its 80th anniversary.

There was talk of the casino in 2006 when the son of the last king of Italy, Vittorio Emanuele di Savoia, was accused of criminal association for money laundering through the structure, an accusation from which he was acquitted because "the fact does not exist", as declared by the investigating judge of the Court of Rome.

On 9 May 2007, in the immediate vicinity of the first headquarters, the new building was inaugurated. The project was carried out by the Swiss architect Mario Botta, for a general business cost of approximately 140 million Swiss francs and a total cost of approximately 193 million Swiss francs (equal to approximately 120 million euros at the date of delivery). The casino was built adjacent to the old one and is clearly visible from all over the lake on which it stands, thanks to its lighting systems, in red colour. As soon as it was inaugurated, critics called the new headquarters an "eco-monster" due to its imposing angular volume.   

On 27 July 2018, the Municipal Casino was declared bankrupt following the economic crisis. The management was entrusted to the bankruptcy trustees.

The casino reopened on 26 January 2022.

Bankruptcy and legal proceedings 
On 27 July 2018 the Court of Como declared the casino bankrupt. The bankruptcy request was presented by the Como prosecutor following the casino's inability to pay the fees due to the Municipality of Campione, the sole shareholder, causing its financial distress. The prosecutor Pasquale Addesso asked for the bankruptcy of the gambling house following the millions in debt created by the town hall. As of 30 April 2018, debts amounted to €132 million, of which €22 million were due to the municipality.

Signs of a possible failure had already arisen at the beginning of the year, with the collective dismissal of 109 employees out of 492, a decision defined by the mayor of the enclave Roberto Salmoiraghi and by the sole administrator Marco Ambrosini as a "deed due in response to the bankruptcy petition requested by the Como Public Prosecutor's Office".

Social and economic consequences 
Following the closure of the gambling house and the collective dismissal of 482 employees, the Campione d'Italia enclave saw a drastic decrease in tourists attracted by the casino, resulting in a rapid worsening of the economic and social conditions of the resident population in the Italian exclave. As a result of the bankruptcy, the kindergarten and a center for the elderly were closed, also leading to numerous warnings from public employees to the municipality regarding non-payment of salaries and lack of contributions to the functioning of fundamental services.

See also
 Vittorio Emanuele, Prince of Naples#Arrest and imprisonment (2006)

References

External links

Official Website

Casinos in Italy
Buildings and structures in the Province of Como
Lake Lugano
Casinos completed in 1917
Casinos completed in 2007
Mario Botta buildings
Italian companies established in 1917
2018 disestablishments in Italy
Campione d'Italia